Junius Brutus Stearns (born Lucius Sawyer Stearns, June 2, 1810September 17, 1885) was an American painter best known for his five-part Washington Series (1847–1856).

He was member of the National Academy of Design for several decades and member of its council.

He was born Lucius Sawyer Stearns in Arlington, Vermont. He named two sons after him, one Lucius Stearns, and the other Junius Brutus Stearns, Jr. Stearns, Jr., served in the Civil War in the 44th Regiment. JB Stearns served in the Civil War as well, New York's 12th Regiment. He also had two other sons, Raphael and Michaelangelo, and a daughter, Edith Sylvia.

His painting The Millennium was submitted as credentials for his admission as a member of the National Academy of Design.

Death
He died September 17, 1885, in Brooklyn, New York, in a horse-and-carriage accident after returning from a night at the theatre. He was interred at Cypress Hills Cemetery in Brooklyn.

Paintings

Stearns is most famous for his series on George Washington. Of these his painting, Washington as a Statesman, depicts President Washington addressing the Constitutional Convention; it is the subject of a US Postage Stamp in 1937.

Stearns also painted a second series of Washington in which he depicted free blacks. Not as much is known about this series or the intentions of the artist in so portraying blacks on the eve of the Civil War, although there was supposition by Mack, et al.

Stearns' painting, Hannah Duston Killing the Indians (1847) depicts the killing by Hannah Duston of Indians who had captured her and murdered her newborn daughter in 1697. In the painting Stearns, for reasons that remain unclear, depicts Samuel Lennardson (Duston's fellow captive) as a woman. The six Indian children Duston killed are omitted. A second painting, showing Hannah's husband fleeing with her children, is now lost.

References

External links

Junius Brutus Stearns at ArtCyclopedia

19th-century American painters
American male painters
1810 births
1885 deaths
People from Arlington, Vermont
Painters from Vermont
Road incident deaths in New York City
Deaths by horse-riding accident in the United States
Burials at Cypress Hills Cemetery
19th-century American male artists